Spartan Municipal Stadium, formerly known as Universal Stadium, is  a stadium in Portsmouth, Ohio.  It hosted the National Football League's Portsmouth Spartans from 1930 to 1933, as well as local high school teams.  The stadium held 8,200 people at its peak and was built in 1928. In 1970, it was renamed Spartan Municipal Stadium. On October 5, 2003, the stadium was designated as a state historical site.  The stadium is owned by the City of Portsmouth. After a fire in the 1990s, the city replaced walls and the press box. The lighting was upgraded using funds from a USDA grant. Several years ago, the city began limiting stadium use to only regular football games to help preserve the sod. In the past, both Portsmouth and Notre Dame High School football teams have played at the facility. The city wanted to sell the stadium to the Portsmouth City School District for one dollar, but the district turned down the offer as they received $10 million from a local foundation to construct their own athletic complex next to the new city school complex.

Notre Dame High School intends to remain at Spartan Stadium. The city has discussed demolishing the stadium for future development but local residents have expressed the need to preserve the historical site.

Spartan Municipal Stadium was recently identified through Portsmouth's participation in the America's Best Communities competition as an invaluable asset for the development of Portsmouth's riverfront area. In September 2017, Dr. Sean Dunne, a Sociology professor at Shawnee State University, submitted an application to State Farm's Neighborhood Assist Program for $25,000 to help renovate the stadium.  In October 2017, it was announced that the application had advanced to the final round of 200 applications. After ten days of online voting, the grant was selected as one of 40 projects to win $25,000. The money has been used to begin the process of renovation at the stadium, with further renovation work to follow.

References

Spartan Municipal Stadium up for $25k grant — Community votes needed to secure funding - Portsmouth Daily Times
Stadium renovation project wins $25k - Portsmouth Daily Times
Stadium renovation plans announced - Portsmouth Daily Times

External links
 Universal Stadium receives state historical site designation
Portsmouth Spartans Historical Society
Scioto Historical's "Spartan Municipal Stadium & NFL Football in Portsmouth, Ohio."

American football venues in Ohio
Sports venues completed in 1930
1930 establishments in Ohio
Defunct National Football League venues
Detroit Lions stadiums
Buildings and structures in Scioto County, Ohio
Portsmouth, Ohio
High school football venues in Ohio
Tourist attractions in Scioto County, Ohio